The Kingdom of Mysore (1399 – 1947 CE) was a kingdom in southern India founded in 1399 by Yaduraya in the region of the modern city of Mysore, in the Karnataka state. The Wodeyar dynasty, as the ruling family is known, ruled the southern Karnataka region until Indian independence in 1947, when the kingdom was merged with the Union of India.

Administration

Records pertaining to the administration of the Mysore territory during the overlordship of the Vijayanagara Empire (1399 to 1565) are not available. After the decline of the Vijayanagara Empire, King Raja Wodeyar gradually gained independence, eventually ousting the governor at Srirangapatna. The regional head of the diminished Empire now ruled from their new capital at Chandragiri (in modern Andhra Pradesh). During the rule of Narasaraja Wodeyar, the first gold coins were issued from Mysore. The position of the fledgling Mysore kingdom improved considerably during the rule of King Chikka Devaraja Wodeyar, who increased the value of the Treasury to 90,000,000 pagoda (a unit of currency). For his achievements, the king earned the title Navakotinarayana (literally nine-crore Narayana). Chikka Devaraja Wodeyar founded the Attara Kacheri, the central secretariat consisting of eighteen departments.

When Haider Ali became the Kingdom's de facto ruler in the later half of the eighteenth century, a large booty of gold coins usurped from the coffers of the Nizam of Golconda helped fund Mysore's expansionary policy. Haider Ali's military success was due to his fast moving French trained cavalry. The Kingdom was divided into 5 provinces (Asofis) of unequal size, comprising 171 Paraganas (taluk) in total. The Sira province comprised 5 Paraganas that contributed 200,000 varaha (a unit of currency) and the Srirangapatna province contained 102 Paraganas and contributed 1,70,0000 varaha.

When Tipu Sultan became the de facto ruler, the Kingdom, which encompassed 62,000 mi2 (160,000 km2), was divided into 37 Asofi and a total of 124 taluks (Amil). Each Asofi had a governor, or Asof, and one deputy Asof. The taluk was headed by an Amildar and a Patel was in charge of a group of villages. The central administration comprised six departments headed by ministers, each aided by an advisory council of up to four members; the military by Mir Miran, the revenue ministry by Mir Asaf, the navy by Mir Yem, the treasury, the commerce and the ordnance by Muluk-ut-Tufar. It has been noted that the policy of replacing Hindu governors with Muslim Asofs may have led to its revenue downfall. It is claimed that for a very brief period, the Kannada language was replaced by the Persian language in administration and accounting. The army consisted of infantry, cavalry, artillery and the navy. The navy had forty ships operating from Mangalore, Kundapura and Tadadi.

Following Tipu's death in 1799, the kingdom came under direct British rule in 1831. Lushington, Briggs and Morrison, the early commissioners, were followed by Mark Cubbon and Lewin Bentham Bowring. Mark Cubbon took charge in 1834 and is known for his excellent handling of the kingdom. He made Bangalore the capital and divided the princely state into 4 divisions, each under a British superintendent. The state was further divided into 120 taluks with 85 taluk courts, with all lower level administration in the Kannada language. The Amildar was in charge of a taluk to whom a Hoblidar, the caretaker of a Hobli comprising a few villages, reported. The office of the commissioner had eight departments; revenue, post, police, cavalry, public works, medical, the animal husbandry, judiciary and education. The judiciary was hierarchical with the commissioners' court at the apex, followed by the Huzur Adalat, four superintending courts and eight Sadar Munsiff courts at the lowest level. Mark Cubbon is credited with the construction of over one thousand miles of roads, hundreds of dams, coffee production and improvements in the tax and revenue systems.

Lewin Bowring became the chief commissioner in 1862 and held the position until 1870. Under Lewin Bowring, the state was divided into three divisions, each under a British commissioner. There were eight districts in all under these divisions, with each looked after by a deputy commissioner who was aided by the Amildars and Hoblidars. The property "Registration Act", the "Indian Penal code" and "Code of Criminal Procedure" came into effect and the judiciary was separated from the executive branch of the administration. Lewin Bowring expanded the education system with the formation of the Central Educational Agency, helping the kingdom modernize quickly. However, unlike Mark Cubbon, Lewin Bowring generally preferred to employ British officers. In 1881, following a strong lobby favouring rendition, the British handed back the administration of Mysore to King Chamaraja Wodeyar VIII. The post of commissioner was abolished and replaced by a Diwan, his two advisers and a British resident in the Mysore court.

C. V. Rungacharlu, a native of Chennai, became the Diwan, while the first ever Representative Assembly of British India, with 144 members consisting of prominent people from various fields was formed in 1881. He identified himself with the Kannada language and patronised it by establishing the Palace drama company. He started favourable economic policies such as public loans and public works as well as building the railway line from Bangalore to Mysore.

He was followed by K. Seshadri Iyer in 1883. During his time, gold mining at Kolar Gold Fields began and extensive coffee plantations and railway lines were laid. The Assembly elections were held with a three-year tenure for elected members. Taluk boards were formed giving decentralised authority at that level, the Mysore Civil Service Examinations were held for the first time in 1891 and the Department of Geology and the Department of Agriculture were founded in 1894 and 1898. Other notable achievements include the construction of the Vanivilas Sagar dam across Vedavati river, the initiation of the Shivanasamudra hydroelectric project in 1899 (the first such major attempt in India), electricity and drinking water (the latter through pipes) being supplied to Bangalore and the founding of the Archaeological Survey of Mysore (1890) and the Oriental Manuscripts Library.

P. N. Krishnamurti, a descendant of Diwan Purnaiah, took office in 1901. The founding of The Secretariat Manual to maintain records, the introduction of British administrative methods and the founding of the Co-operative Department in 1905 are credited to him. V. P. Madhava Rao, who became the Diwan in 1906, paid attention to conservation of forests. He started the Legislative Council in 1907, the Central Co-operative Bank in Bangalore, aided the Vokkaligara Sangha in 1906 and created the Mysore News Paper Regulation Act of 1908. He was followed by T. Ananda Rao, who inaugurated the Mysore Economic Conference, finalised the Krishna Raja Sagara dam and completed the Mysore Palace in 1910.

The name Sir M. Visvesvaraya, popularly known as the "Maker of Modern Mysore" holds pride of place in the history of Karnataka. A visionary by any standard and an engineer by education, he wrote the book A Vision of Prosperous Mysore in 1902, stressing the need for technological and educational advancement as a catalyst to industry, commerce and agriculture. He became the Diwan in 1909. Membership of the Mysore Legislative Assembly was increased from 18 to 24 with powers to discuss the state budget. The Mysore Economic Conference was expanded into three committees; industry and commerce, education and agriculture, with publications in English and Kannada. Village panchayats, local boards and municipalities were headed by elected members. A long list of important projects were commissioned during his time including the construction of the Krishna Raja Sagara dam, the Government Soap Factory and the Mysore Sandal Oil Factory, the founding of the Iron and Steel Works in Bhadravati, and the Mysore Bank in 1913. Visvesvaraya founded the University of Mysore in 1916, the Mysore Chamber of Commerce and Industry, the Visvesvaraya College of Engineering in Bangalore and the Karnataka Sahitya Parishad. He was followed by Sir M. Kantaraj Urs in 1919 and Sir Albion Rajkumar Banerjee in 1922.

Sir Mirza Ismail took office as Diwan in 1926 and built on the foundation laid by Visvesvaraya, making substantial progress in modernising the Kingdom of Mysore. Amongst his contributions were the expansion of the Bhadravati Iron works, and founding of a cement and paper factory in Bhadravati. Hindustan Aeronautics Limited, a porcelain factory and a glass factory were founded in Bangalore, a sugar factory at Mysore and the first fertilizer factory in Belgola were established. An able administrator with a penchant for gardens, he founded the Brindavan Gardens (Krishnaraja Sagar), the Mysore Medical College and the Kaveri high level canal to irrigate  in modern Mandya district. Ismail was followed by Sir N. Madhava Rao and Sir Arcot Ramasamy Mudaliar before the Kingdom was incorporated into the newly independent India in 1947.

Notes

References
 Suryanath U. Kamat, A Concise history of Karnataka from pre-historic times to the present, Jupiter books, MCC, Bangalore, 2001 (Reprinted 2002) OCLC: 7796041
 

Kingdom of Mysore